The Gustav Becker House is located at 2408 Van Buren Avenue, in Ogden, Utah, United States.  It was built around 1915 based on Frank Lloyd Wright's "A Fireproof House for $5,000" published in Ladies' Home Journal in April 1907.  It was designed in detail by Salt Lake architects Ware & Treganza.

References

External links
Photo Collection at Prairie School Traveler

Houses completed in 1915
Houses in Weber County, Utah
Houses on the National Register of Historic Places in Utah
Buildings and structures in Ogden, Utah
Prairie School architecture in Utah
National Register of Historic Places in Weber County, Utah